Jack Barry may refer to:

Jack Barry (baseball) (1887–1961), American baseball player and manager
Jack Barry (Gaelic footballer) (born 1990s), county player for Kerry
Jack Barry (game show host) (1918–1984), American television host and producer
Shad Barry (1878–1936), known also as Jack Barry, American baseball player

See also
Jack Berry (disambiguation)
John Barry (disambiguation)